Gmod or GMOD may refer to:

 Generic Model Organism Database (GMOD), a software project for model organism databases
 .GMOD, file extension for Golgotha 3D models; See List of filename extensions (F–L)
 Gamma-ray MODule (GMOD), an instrument on the satellite EIRSAT-1
 G-module (G-Mod), in mathematics
 Garry's Mod (GMod), a sandbox game based on a modification of the first-person shooter video game Half-Life 2